Canal+ Liga de Campeones was a Spanish television station owned and operated by Sogecable.

External links
Digital+ – Official site

Defunct television channels in Spain
Television channels and stations established in 2012
Canal+ (Spanish TV provider)
Sports television in Spain